The MTU/Pratt & Whitney RTF-180 was a planned turbofan aircraft engine that was to be jointly developed by Motoren-und Turbinen Union (MTU) and Pratt & Whitney in the early 1990s. It was to be the first civil engine program where MTU would be the prime contractor.

A November 1990 internal briefing showed that the RTF-180 was one of the engines on offer for the 90-115 seat MPC 75, a regional airliner requiring  of static thrust. In March 1991, the RTF-180 engine was proposed as a possible powerplant for an 80-130 seat airliner from a consortium of Germany's Deutsche Aerospace (DASA), France's Aérospatiale, and Italy's Alenia. The design of the RTF-180 for that airliner initially included a  fan, three-stage low-pressure compressor, eight-stage high-pressure compressor, one-stage high-pressure turbine, and four-stage low-pressure turbine.

At the 1993 Paris Air Show, MTU and Pratt & Whitney announced that they would abandon the RTF-180 in favor of a joint project with General Electric and SNECMA.

Specifications

References

Bibliography

 
 
 

Pratt & Whitney aircraft engines
High-bypass turbofan engines